A gingerbread man is a biscuit or cookie made of gingerbread, in human shape.

Gingerbread Man may also refer to:

Media

Music

Songs 

 "Gingerbread Man", a 1968 song by Tommy James and the Shondells
 "Gingerbread Man", a 2015 song by Melanie Martinez
 "Gingerbread Man", a 2009 song by Gucci Mane featuring OJ da Juiceman

Albums 

 Gingerbread Man (album), a 1994 album by The Residents
 Gingerbread Men (album), a 1966 album by Clark Terry and Bob Brookmeyer

Film 

 Gingerbread Man, a character voiced by Conrad Vernon in the Shrek films
 The Gingerbread Man, a 1998 film by Robert Altman
 The Ginger Bread Boy, a 1934 cartoon short based on the fairytale
 The Gingerdead Man, a 2006 comedy-horror film

Theatre 

 The Gingerbread Man, a 1906 musical play by Frederick Ranken and Alfred Baldwin Sloane
 The Gingerbread Man (musical), a two-act musical play written by David Wood
 The Gingerbread Lady, a 1970 play

Literature 

 "The Gingerbread Man", a fairy tale
 "The Gingerbread Girl", a 2007 novella by Stephen King
 The Ginger Man, a 1955 novel by J.P. Donleavy

Other 

 The Gingerbread Man (TV series), a stop motion-animated television series adapted from David Wood's musical

Other

 Gingerbreadman map, a chaotic mathematical 2D map
 Runner's diarrhea, also known as the gingerbread man

See also

 Gingerbread (disambiguation)